American Network was a cable/satellite television network owned by Televisa. Established in 2002, the channel broadcast throughout Mexico, Guatemala, and El Salvador featuring English language programs originating from the United States. Most of the shows were CBS Television Studios-owned or distributed programming. American Network's coverage included all CBS News shows.  Other shows on its schedule included programming from CBS Sports and Food Network.

The network ran an announcement, from August 22, 2011, that it would end its broadcast on September 5, 2011. It was replaced by Tiin, a Mexican Spanish-language network oriented to teenagers and kids.

Programs broadcast by American Network

TV Shows
The Office
Modern Family
Superstore
George Lopez

Comedy
Grizzy and the Lemmings
Family Guy
High Kick!

Game shows
Jeopardy!
Wheel of Fortune
American Gladiators
Survivor

News
48 hours
60 Minutes
CBS News Sunday Morning
CBS Evening News
The Early Show
Entertainment Tonight
 Inside Edition

Dramas
The Nine
The Rookie
Rookie Blue
Chicken Girls
Durban Gen

Sitcoms and series
Modern Men
Bizaardvark
The IT Crowd
Mom

Cooking
$40 a Day
30 Minute Meals
Barefoot Contessa
Behind the Bash
Giada's Weekend Getaways
Iron Chef
Rachael Ray's Tasty Travels
Tyler's Ultimate
Everyday Italian
Paula's Home Cooking

Sporting events
American Network broadcast college basketball and football games along with other sports programming from CBS Sports.

External links
 American Network Official Site (Spanish)

Television networks in Mexico
Televisa pay television networks
Defunct television channels in Mexico
Television channels and stations established in 2002
Television channels and stations disestablished in 2011
2002 establishments in Mexico